The Institute of Diplomacy and International Affairs (IDIA) is the agency of the Ministry of Foreign Affairs of the Republic of China.

History
IDIA was originally established in January 1969 as Foreign Service Training Institute and renamed to Foreign Service Institute in 1971. In March 2004, the Executive Yuan gave approval for the establishment of the Institute of Diplomacy and International Affairs, and IDIA was inaugurated on 1 September 2012.

Organizational structure
Division of Training and Planning
Division of Research and International Exchanges
Secretariat
Accounting Officer

See also
 Ministry of Foreign Affairs (Taiwan)

References

External links

2012 establishments in Taiwan
Executive Yuan
Foreign relations of Taiwan
Government agencies established in 2012